The Royal Thai Navy (Abrv: RTN, ทร.;) is the naval warfare force of Thailand. Established in 1906, it was modernised by the Admiral Prince Abhakara Kiartiwongse (1880–1923) who is known as the father of the Royal Navy. It has a structure that includes the naval fleet, Royal Thai Marine Corps, and Air and Coastal Defence Command. The RTN headquarters is at Sattahip Naval Base.

The navy operates three naval area commands (NAC): Northern Gulf of Thailand (First NAC); Southern Gulf of Thailand (Second NAC); and the Andaman Sea (Indian Ocean) (Third NAC). RTN also has two air wings and one flying unit on its aircraft carrier.

History

Ancient era 

The military history of Thailand encompasses 1,000 years of armed struggle, from wars of independence from the Khmer Empire through to struggles with her regional rivals, Burma and Vietnam, and periods of conflict with Britain and France during the colonial era.

The naval arm of the army consisted mainly of riverine war craft whose mission was to control the Chao Phraya River and protect ships carrying the army to battle. The warships carried up to 30 musketeers, a large number of rowers and a front 6 or 12-pounder cannons or no guns at all.

The Siamese navy was also supported by Chinese immigrants, mostly in Chantaburi. During the era of Taksin the Great, his army successfully sieged the old capital of Ayutthaya with the help of the Chinese shipwrights who are masters of building war junks, which carried more guns than riverine warcrafts.

Vietnamese-Siamese war 

The timeline of emergence of a Siamese sea fleet is unknown.  Most of its sailors were foreign, such as Cham, Malay, and Chinese.  It is assumed that in this era, Ships designs changed from shallow draft Chinese junk (Reu-Sam-Pau/Reụ̄x s̄ảp̣heā) to deeper draft Kam-pan and sloop; with a short period of copied Vietnamese junks.  The most prominent naval battle was at Vàm Nao River.

Franco-Siamese War 

The Paknam Incident was a navy engagement fought during the Franco-Siamese War in July 1893.  Three French ships violated Siamese territory and warning shots were fired at them by a Siamese fort and a force of gunboats on the Chao Phraya River in Paknam. In the ensuing battle, France prevailed and blockaded Bangkok. Peace was restored on 3 October 1893 after the British put pressure on both the Siamese and French to reach a negotiated settlement.

World War I 

The First World War had no direct impact on Siam due to its distance from the fighting. The war did, however, provide an opportunity for King Rama VI to strengthen his country's position in the international arena. He also used the war as a means to promote the concept of a Siamese nation.

Siamese sailors were part of a volunteer expeditionary force, consisting of medical, motor transport, and aviation detachments. By early-1918, 1,284 men were selected from thousands of volunteers. The force was commanded by Major General Phraya Bhijai Janriddhi and was sent to France.

After World War I

Franco-Thai War
The Battle of Ko Chang took place on 17 January 1941 during the Franco-Thai War in which a flotilla of French warships attacked a smaller force of Thai vessels, including a coastal defence ship. The HTMS Thonburi was heavily damaged and grounded on a sand bar at the mouth of the Chanthaburi River, with about 20 dead. The Thai transport HTMS Chang arrived at Ko Chang shortly after the French departed and took the Thonburi in tow, before purposefully running her aground in Laem Ngop.

The French suffered 11 men killed. During the post-action investigations, the Thai Navy claimed, based on statements by Thai sailors and the fisherman around Ko Chang and merchantmen in Saigon, that heavy damage was seen to have been caused to the French ship Lamotte-Picquet and her squadron. The battle was a tactical victory by the French Navy over the Thai Navy although the strategic result is disputed. The Japanese intervened diplomatically and mediated a ceasefire. Within a month of the engagement, the French and the Thais had negotiated a peace that ended the war.

World War II

During World War II, Siam allied with Japan after Japan invaded Siam on 8 December 1941. Thailand officially joined the war in January 1942.

Thai submarines saw service throughout World War II, but saw no combat. Two of them did serve an unconventional role during the war. On 14 April 1945, five months before the Japanese surrender, Bangkok's Samsen and Wat Liab Power Plants were bombed by the Allies, leaving the city without electricity. In response to a request from the Bangkok Electricity Authority, the Matchanu and Wirun anchored at the Bangkok Dock Company and served as power generators for one of Bangkok's tram lines.

Manhattan Rebellion

During the Manhattan Rebellion of 1951, the navy was involved in a failed coup against Prime Minister Plaek Phibunsongkhram which led to the sinking of flagship HTMS Sri Ayudhya.

Vietnam War
In support of South Vietnam and its allies during the Vietnam War, two Thai naval vessels supported ground forces with naval bombardments.

Later years

The navy's combat forces include the Royal Fleet and the Royal Thai Marine Corps. The 130 vessels of the Royal Fleet include frigates equipped with surface-to-air missiles, fast attack craft armed with surface-to-surface missiles, large coastal patrol craft, coastal minelayers, coastal minesweepers, landing craft, and training ships.

The mission space of the Thailand navy includes rivers and the Gulf of Thailand and the Indian Ocean, which are separated by the Kra Isthmus. Naval affairs are directed by the country's most senior admiral from his Bangkok headquarters. The naval commander in chief is supported by staff groups that plan and administer such activities as logistics, education and training, and various special services. The headquarters general staff function like the corresponding staffs in the Royal Thai Army army and Royal Thai Air Force command structures.

Command and control

The Royal Thai Navy is commanded by the Commander-in-Chief of the Royal Thai Navy, currently, Admiral Choengchai Chomchoengpaet, who was appointed in 2022. The Royal Thai Navy headquarters is in Bangkok.
Commander-in-Chief, Royal Thai Navy: Admiral Choengchai Chomchoengpaet
Deputy Commander-in-Chief, Royal Thai Navy: Admiral Talensak Sirisawat
President, Royal Thai Navy Advisory Group: Admiral Wuttichai Saisathien
Assistant Commander-in-Chief, Royal Thai Navy: Admiral Suwin Jangyodsuk
Chief of Staff, Royal Thai Navy: Admiral Chonlathit Navanukroh
Commander-in-Chief, Royal Thai Fleet: Admiral Adung Phan-iam

Naval Area Commands

Naval Area Commands

The Royal Thai Navy operates three naval area commands:
 First Naval Area Command: responsible for the northern part of Gulf of Thailand
 Second Naval Area Command: responsible for the southern part of Gulf of Thailand
 Third Naval Area Command: responsible for the Andaman Sea (Indian Ocean)

District forces
 Navy Fleet District Forces
 Northern Gulf of Thailand Fleet
 Southern Gulf of Thailand Fleet
 Andaman Sea Fleet
 Royal Thai Naval Air District Forces
 U-Tapao Royal Thai Navy Airfield
 Chanthaburi Airstrip
 Nakhon Phanom Royal Thai Navy Base
 Songkhla Royal Thai Navy Airfield
 Phuket Royal Thai Navy Airfield
 Narathiwat Airstrip
 Navy Bases District Forces
 Sattahip Naval Base
 Bangkok Naval Base
 Phang Nga Naval Base
 Songkhla Naval Base
 Phuket Naval Base
 Samui Naval Base
 Trat Naval Base

Organization

Royal Thai Naval Dockyard

The Naval Dockyard was on Arun amarin Road, Siriraj Subdistrict, Bangkoknoi District, Bangkok. It has constructed and repaired ships since the reign of King Mongkut. As ships grew larger, King Chulalongkorn ordered the construction of a large wooden dock. He presided over the opening ceremony on 9 January 1890, a date now considered the birth of the Naval Department. Its headquarters is now at Mahidol Adulyadej Naval Dockyard, Sattahip District, Chonburi Province.

Ships built during the reign of King Rama VIII, Ananda Mahidol:
 HTMS Sarasin-class: Fisheries boat; displacement 50 tons; three ships in this class
 Coast Guard Boat 9 class: Coast Guard boat; displacement 11.25 tons; four ships in this class
 HTMS Prong: Tanker; displacement 150 tons
Ships built during the reign of King Rama IX, King Bhumibol Adulyadej the Great:
 HTMS Khamronsin (II)-class: Corvette; displacement 450 tons; three ships in this class
 HTMS Hua Hin-class: Patrol gunboat; displacement 530 tons; three ships in this class
 HTMS Sattahip (I)-class: Torpedo boat; displacement 110 tons
 Tor.91-class: Patrol Boat: displacement 115 tons; nine ships in this class
 Thor (II)-class: Minesweeper; displacement 29.56 tons; five ships in this class
 HTMS Proet: Tanker; displacement 412 tons; two ships in this class
 HTMS Chuang-class: Water tanker; displacement 360 tons; two ships in this class 
 HTMS Samaesarn (II)-class: Tugboat; displacement 328 tons; two ships in this class
 Tor.991-class: Gunboat; displacement 115 tons; four ships in this class
 HTMS Krabi-class: Offshore patrol vessel; displacement 1,969 tons; two ships in this class
 HTMS Laemsing-class: Patrol gunboat; displacement 520 tons

Royal Thai Marine Corps
The Royal Thai Marine Corps (RTMC) was founded in 1932, when the first battalion was formed with the assistance of the United States Marine Corps. It was expanded to a regiment in 1940 and was in action against communist guerrillas throughout the 1950s and 1960s. During the 1960s, the United States Marine Corps assisted in its expansion into a brigade. In December 1978, RECON teams of The Royal Thai Marine Corps were sent to the Mekong River during skirmishes with the Pathet Lao, a communist political movement and organisation in Laos.

Thai Marines today are responsible for border security in Chanthaburi and Trat provinces. They have fought communist insurgents in engagements at Baan Hard Lek, Baan Koat Sai, Baan Nhong Kok, Baan Kradook Chang, Baan Chumrark, and in the battle of Hard Don Nai in Nakhon Phanom Province. They serve in 2019 in the southern border provinces currently affected by the South Thailand insurgency. A monument to their valor stands at the Royal Thai Navy base at Sattahip.

Marine special force 
The RTMC Reconnaissance Battalion, known as "RECON", is a reconnaissance battalion. It falls under the command of the Royal Thai Marine Division. The mission of Reconnaissance Battalion is to provide task forces to conduct amphibious reconnaissance, ground reconnaissance, battlespace shaping operations, raids, and specialized insertion and extraction.

Naval Special Warfare Command

The Naval Special Warfare Command was set up as an underwater demolition assault unit in 1956 with the assistance of the US. A small element of the Navy SEALs has been trained to conduct maritime counter-terrorism missions. The unit has close ties with the United States Navy SEALs and conducts regular joint training exercises.

Most of the operations of the Navy SEALs are highly sensitive and are rarely divulged to the public. Navy SEALs have been used to gather intelligence along the Thai border during times of heightened tension. Navy SEALs have participated in anti-piracy operations in the Gulf of Thailand.

Thai Navy SEALs participated in the Tham Luang cave rescue. The rescue team successfully extricated members of 12 junior football players and their coach, who were trapped in Tham Luang Nang Non Cave in Chiang Rai Province in July 2018. One former Navy SEAL died in the rescue effort.

Air and Coastal Defence Command

The Air and Coastal Defence Command was formed in 1992 under the control of the Royal Fleet Headquarters, with one coastal defence regiment and one air defence regiment. Personnel were initially drawn from the Royal Thai Marine Corps, but are now being recruited directly. The First Coastal Defence Regiment is based near the Marine Corps facility at Sattahip. The First Air Defence Regiment was near the Naval Air Wing at U-Tapao. Coastal Defence Command was greatly expanded in 1992, following the government's decision in 1988 to charge the RTN with the responsibility of defending the eastern seaboard and Southern Seaboard Development Project. The Second Air Defence Regiment, based at Songkhla, was formed the following year. Some analysts believe that this element will eventually grow to a strength of up to 15,000 personnel.

 The First Air Defence Regiment: its mission is to provide anti-aircraft defence for the northern Gulf of Thailand with three anti-aircraft battalions.
 The Second Air Defence Regiment: to provide anti-aircraft defence for the southern Gulf of Thailand and Andaman Sea with three anti-aircraft battalions.
 The First Coastal Defence Regiment: has three artillery battalions.
 Two Air and Coastal Defence Command and Control Centers
 Air and Coastal Defence Supporting Regiment: one transportation battalion, one communications battalion, one maintenance battalion.

Royal Thai Naval Air Division 

The RTN recently has two air wings and one Flying Unit of aircraft carrier HTMS Chakri Naruebet, operating 23 fixed-wing aircraft and 26 helicopters from U-Tapao, Songkhla, and Phuket. The First Royal Thai Navy wing has three squadrons; the Second Royal Thai Navy wing has three squadrons and another wing for HTMS Chakri Naruebet Flying Unit.

Riverine Patrol Regiment

The Royal Thai Navy RTN Riverine Patrol Regiment keeps the peace, prevents illegal immigration, human trafficking, drug smuggling or any other threats to national security on the Chao Phraya and Mekong Rivers and elsewhere. Royal Thai Navy Riverine Patrol detachments are stationed in several provinces:

Royal Thai Naval Academy

The Royal Thai Naval Academy in Samut Prakan was established by King Chulalongkorn (Rama V) in 1898, Those who want to enter the academy first have to pass the entrance exam, after which they join a three-year preparatory program at the Armed Forces Academies Preparatory School where they study together with army, air force, and police cadets. On successful completion, they enter the academy. After graduation, they attend a further one-year advanced course at Sattahip that leads to a graduate diploma in naval science. On completion of this course, they are ready to work as officers in the Royal Thai Navy or Royal Thai Marine Corps. Cadets graduate with a bachelor's degree in engineering or science and are commissioned in the Royal Thai Navy with the rank of ensign (sub-lieutenant). Together with graduates of the other armed forces and police academies they receive their swords from the king personally or the king's representative. Selected first-year cadets of the RTNA are awarded scholarships to study at naval academies abroad. On their return to Thailand they start working as officers in the Royal Thai Navy straightaway.

Naval Medical Department 

The Naval Medical Department was first set up on 1 April 1890 and is headquartered at Somdech Phra Pinklao Hospital in Bangkok. It provides medical services for sailors of the Royal Thai Navy and operates a number of hospitals in Thailand including Queen Sirikit Naval Hospital in Chonburi, opened on 20 November 1995.

Royal Thai Navy Music Division 

A Royal Thai Navy band has existed since the RTN was only a naval department of the Royal Thai Army. Its began with the creation of the "Naval Trumpet Band" on 10 June 1878, with the arrival of the new royal yacht Vesatri and her captain, M. Fusco, who later was one of the training instructors.

Captain Fusco had the duty to stage musicals for King Rama V when the king traveled by sea, as when King Chulalongkorn visited Europe in 1897. The government assigned the young ensemble under the command of Captain Fusco to the Royal Yacht Maha Chakri''' for the voyage to Europe. This band would later become the basis of the Royal Thai Navy Music Division of the RTN Bangkok Naval Base. Today, the RTNMD stations bands in all naval bases and installations, as well as in educational institutions.

 Naval Military Police Regiment 

The navy was the first branch of the Thai military to create a military police unit. The naval military police was established at the order of Marshal Admiral Paribatra Sukhumbandhu, Prince of Nakhon Sawan, who was a naval commander at that time. 
The official founding date was on 14 December 1905 by the Department of Mechanical Ships and the Department of Naval Affairs.

 Equipment 

The Royal Thai Navy fleet consists of ships constructed in Canada, China, Germany, Italy, Singapore, South Korea, Spain, the United States, and the United Kingdom. Thai shipbuilding companies and RTN dockyards such as Mahidol Adulyadej Naval Dockyard, Asian Marine Services, Marsun Shipbuilding, Italthai Marine, and Bangkok Dock also have the capability to construct vessels. 

Humanitarian relief operations
Thailand worked with more than 60 nations in providing help to the Nepali people following an earthquake. Operation Sahayogi Haat ('helping hands') was a US military relief operation delivering humanitarian assistance to victims of the April and May 2015 Nepal earthquakes. The Royal Thai Navy assisted relief efforts. A magnitude 7.8 earthquake struck the region of Kathmandu in Nepal on 25 April 2015. Operation Sahayogi Haat for humanitarian relief operations was put into action by Joint Task Force 505 on 6 May 2015.

Royal Barges

The royal barge is the type of vessel for Thailand's Royal Barge Procession, when is a ceremony of both religious and royal significance which has taken place for almost 700 years when was the earliest historical evidence of royal barges dates from the Sukhothai period (1238–1438). The royal barges are a blend of craftsmanship and traditional Thai art. The Royal Barge Procession takes place rarely, marking only the most significant cultural and religious events.

Royal barge Narai Song Suban Ratchakan Thi Kao or the royal barge Narai Song Suban HM King Rama IX is the only barge out of four royal barges which was built under commission by the Royal Thai Navy, along with the Thai Department of Fine Arts.

She was built during the reign of HM King Rama IX Bhumibol Adulyadej, who laid the keel in 1994.  Thus Narai Song Suban HM King Rama IX'' was launched on 6 May 1996 to be commissioned and coincide with the celebration of the 50 anniversary of Bhumibol Adulyadej's accession to the throne.

Budget
The RTN budget for FY2021 is 48,289 million baht, up from 47,050M baht in FY2020 and 45,485M baht in FY2019.

Engagements

Rank structure

See also
 Admiral Prince Abhakara Kiartiwongse, Prince of Chumphon
 Royal Thai Armed Forces Headquarters
 Military of Thailand
 Royal Thai Army
 Royal Thai Air Force
 Royal Thai Marine Corps
 Royal Thai Naval Academy

References

Notes

Citations

Bibliography
 
 
 
Ruth, Richard A. "Prince Abhakara's Experiences with Britain's Royal Navy: Education, Geopolitical Rivalries and the Role of a Cretan Adventure in Apotheosis". Sojourn: Journal of Social Issues in Southeast Asia, vol. 34, no. 1, 2019, pp. 1–47. JSTOR, www.jstor.org/stable/26594523.

External links

 Official site 
  Official site 
 Global Security – Thailand navy